Iraqi insurgency may refer to:
 Iraqi insurgency (2003–2011), part of the Iraq War
 Iraqi insurgency (2003–2006), 2003–2006 phase of the Iraqi insurgency
 Iraqi civil war (2006–2008), multi-sided civil war in Iraq
 Iraqi insurgency (2011–2013), following the withdrawal of U.S. troops from Iraq
 War in Iraq (2013–2017), armed conflict between ISIL and Iraq
 ISIL insurgency in Iraq (2017–present), continued ISIL insurgency following territorial defeat